The Higher Law may refer to:
 Higher Law Theory, arguing that no written law may be enforced unless it conforms with certain unwritten, universal principles of fairness, morality, and justice
 The Higher Law (1911 film), directed by George Nichols
 The Higher Law (1914 film), a lost film